Sudha is a Hindu/Sanskrit Indian feminine given name.

Sudha may also refer to:

 Sudha Productions, an Indian film company
 Sudha (magazine), a Kannada-language Indian magazine
 Suda or Souda, a 10th-century Byzantine encyclopedia
 Bihar State Milk Co-operative Federation, a milk cooperative selling with the brand name Sudha Dairy